The Lagoa do Parado Municipal Nature Park is a municipal nature park in the state of Paraná, Brazil.
It protects an area of marshland rich in biodiversity.

Location

The Lagoa do Parado Municipal Nature Park is on the left bank of the Cubatãozinho River in the municipality of Guaratuba, Paraná, at the foot of the Serra do Mar.
The climate is tropical super-humid, with no defined dry season.

The lagoa is a river that floods an immense green area on rainy days.
In the less rainy periods the Lagoa do Parado divides into the Lagoa das Onças and the Lagoa Baguary. 
It can be reached only by boat, taking about an hour from the town of Guaratuba.
The park adjoins the Saint-Hilaire/Lange National Park.
It is in the Guaratuba Environmental Protection Area.
It is part of the Lagamar Mosaic of conservation units.

Environment

The lagoon has many caxeta trees, a light wood used to make wooden shoes, pencils, wooden spoons and craft items.
The lagoon has abundant fish, and is the largest breeding place for marine life in Guaratuba Bay.
It forms an environment like the Pantanal, where birds and small animals forage.
It is said to be the area with greatest biodiversity on the coast of Paraná.
Capybaras may be seen in the lagoon.
Other animals are broad-snouted caiman, lowland paca and common agouti, as well as birds such as herons, ducks and neotropic cormorants.
The wattled jacana is a common bird in the ponds and swamps of Brazil.
The marsh antwren is rare and considered endangered, a small creeping species identified only recently.

In 2013 ICMBio, IBAMA, IAP and the Environmental Police investigated reports of illegal hunting, fishing and harvesting of palmito-juçara in the park.

Notes

Sources

Municipal nature parks of Brazil
Protected areas of Paraná (state)